Hu Jia may refer to:

Hu Jia (activist) (born 1973), Chinese pro-democracy and HIV/AIDS activist 
Hu Jia (diver) (born 1983), Chinese Olympic diver

See also
 Hujia, a traditional Mongolian instrument